Peyton Place may refer to:

 Peyton Place (novel), a 1956 novel by Grace Metalious
Peyton Place, a fictional New England town that is the setting for the 1956 novel
 Peyton Place (film), a 1957 film, adapted from the novel
 Return to Peyton Place, a 1959 follow-up novel also by Grace Metalious
 Return to Peyton Place (film), the 1961 sequel to the 1957 film
 Peyton Place (TV series), an ABC prime time soap opera from 1964 to 1969, also adapted from the 1956 novel
 Return to Peyton Place (TV series), an NBC daytime soap opera that ran from 1972 to 1974
 Murder in Peyton Place, a 1977 television movie based on the 1964 TV series
 Peyton Place: The Next Generation, a 1985 television movie based on the 1964 TV series
 "Peyton Place", a song by the band Squeeze, released on their album Frank in 1989
 Looking for Peyton Place, a 2005 novel by Barbara Delinsky

See also
 Payton's Place, a 1995 jazz album by Nicholas Payton
 Peyton's Places, a sports television show starring Peyton Manning